Alessandro Cesarini, iuniore (1592 – 25 January 1644) was a Roman Catholic prelate who served as Cardinal-Deacon of Sant'Eustachio (1638–1644), Cardinal-Deacon of Santa Maria in Cosmedin (1637–1638), Bishop of Viterbo e Tuscania (1636–1638), Cardinal-Deacon of Santi Cosma e Damiano (1632–1637), and Cardinal-Deacon of Santa Maria in Domnica (1627–1632).

Biography 
Alessandro Cesarini was born in Rome, Italy in 1592, the son of Giuliano Cesarini, marquis of Civitanova e Montecorato, and Livia Orsini. His family produced a number of cardinals including his great-grand uncle Cardinal Alessandro Cesarini, seniore (installed 1517); Giuliano Cesarini, seniore (installed 1426); and Giuliano Cesarini, iuniore (installed 1493). He attended the University of Parma and then obtained a doctorate in Rome. He served as papal prelate, Cleric of the Apostolic Chamber, and as the Governor of the conclave of 1623, in which Pope Urban VIII was elected.
 
On 30 August 1627 he was created as cardinal deacon in the consistory of 30 August 1627 by Pope Urban VIII and installed on 6 October 1627 as Cardinal-Deacon of Santi Cosma e Damiano. On 6 September 1632 he was appointed Cardinal-Deacon of Santi Cosma e Damiano by Pope Urban VIII. On 14 May 1636 he was elected during the papacy of Pope Urban VIII as Bishop of Viterbo e Tuscania. On 25 May 1636 he was consecrated bishop at the Quirinale Palace in Rome by Antonio Marcello Barberini, seniore, with Fabrizio Suardi, Bishop of Lucera, and Benedetto Landi, Bishop of Fossombrone, serving as co-consecrators. On 9 February 1637 he was appointed during the papacy of Pope Urban VIII as Cardinal-Deacon of Santa Maria in Cosmedin. On 28 July 1638 he was appointed during the papacy of Pope Urban VIII as Cardinal-Deacon of Sant'Eustachio. On 13 September 1638 he resigned as Bishop of Viterbo e Tuscania. He died on 25 January 1644 in Rome. He was buried in the tomb of his family in the church of Santi Maria in Aracoeli in Rome.

Episcopal succession

References  

 
 
 
 
 
 

16th-century Italian Roman Catholic bishops
17th-century Italian Roman Catholic bishops
Bishops appointed by Pope Urban VIII
Cardinals created by Pope Urban VIII
1592 births
1644 deaths
Clergy from Rome